Hexamethylenediimine is the organic compound with the formula H2CN(CH2)6NCH2. The molecule is a diimine, consisting of a hexamethylene hydrocarbon chain terminated with imine functional groups. It is the result of the imine Formation, or alkylimino-de-oxo-bisubstitution, of hexamethylenediamine.

References 

Imines